The 2nd Michigan Infantry Regiment was an infantry regiment that served in the Union Army during the American Civil War.

Service
The 2nd Michigan Infantry was organized by Francis William Kellogg and others at Fort Wayne in Detroit, Michigan. It mustered into Federal service for a three-year enlistment on May 25, 1861. Another key early supporter and recruiter was future general Israel B. Richardson.

The regiment included Sarah Emma Edmonds (aka "Franklin Thompson") who had enlisted in Company F disguised as a man. Anna Etheridge served as the regimental vivandiere.

The regiment was mustered out on August 1, 1865, at Detroit.

Total strength and casualties
The regiment suffered 11 officers and 214 enlisted men who were killed in action or mortally wounded and 4 officers and 143 enlisted men who died of disease, for a total of 372 
fatalities.

Commanders
 Colonel Orlando M. Poe
 Colonel William Humphrey

See also
List of Michigan Civil War Units
Michigan in the American Civil War
Sarah Emma Edmonds

Notes

References
The Civil War Archive

Units and formations of the Union Army from Michigan
1865 disestablishments in Michigan
1861 establishments in Michigan
Military units and formations established in 1861
Military units and formations disestablished in 1865